Hamburg is an unincorporated community in Hardin County, Tennessee. Hamburg is located on the west bank of the Tennessee River, south of Savannah.

References

Unincorporated communities in Hardin County, Tennessee
Unincorporated communities in Tennessee
Tennessee populated places on the Tennessee River